Tenterhooks is the third album by the American musician Chris Mars, released in 1995. Its title comes from the tenterhooks used to stretch cloth.

Mars chose not to tour in support of the album; instead, a band named the Wallmen promoted it, placing a cardboard model of Mars onstage.

Production
Produced by Mars, the album was recorded in his living room. Mars's deal with Bar/None provided him with digital recording equipment. Mars created the album artwork.

Critical reception

Trouser Press noted the "new-found fascination with an odd amalgamation of styles that run from rap and jazz to disco and Midwestern surf-rock—complete with kettle drums, strings and found sounds." Entertainment Weekly deemed the album "twisted, stylized, and strained, a concoction of decadent cocktail music." 

Stereo Review called it "left-field, eclectic Brit-styled pop." Rolling Stone likened Mars's voice to that of Ray Davies. The Toronto Sun considered "White Patty Rap" to be "a contender for party song of the year."

AllMusic wrote: "As was evident on his first two releases, Mars has a distinctive voice, but the appeal of his vocals is limited, and it's likely only hardcore fans of his old band, the Replacements, would be willing to submit to it."

Track listing
"White Patty Rap"
"Forkless Tree"
"Mary"
"Lizard Brain"
"Hate It"
"Brother Song"
"Water Biscuits"
"E.I.B. Negative"
"Haunted Town"
"Floater"
"Cadaver Dogs"
"New Day"

References

1995 albums
Chris Mars albums